The Frederick Douglass–Susan B. Anthony Memorial Bridge (informally called the Freddie-Sue Bridge and known as the Troup–Howell Bridge until July 13, 2007) is a triple steel arch bridge carrying Interstate 490 (I-490) over the Genesee River and New York State Route 383 (NY 383, named Exchange Boulevard) in downtown Rochester, New York. The bridge, officially completed on June 18, 2007, replaced a 50-year-old multi-girder bridge situated in the same location.

Description

The roadway on its surface is eight lanes wide, with four reserved for each direction of I-490. The structure carries an estimated 71,640 vehicles daily over NY 383 and the Genesee.

The New York State Department of Transportation is responsible for maintenance on the bridge.

History

Construction on the new bridge, then known as the "Troup–Howell Bridge", began in April 2004. To prevent the flow of traffic from being halted on I-490, the construction of the arch bridge and the demolition of the girder bridge were done in stages, which allowed a minimum of four lanes of traffic, two in each direction, to be open at all times. On June 18, 2007, the bridge was officially completed and fully open to traffic for the first time.

In a ceremony at the bridge on July 13, 2007, the bridge was renamed the "Frederick Douglass–Susan B. Anthony Memorial Bridge", honoring Frederick Douglass and Susan B. Anthony, both of whom had ties to Rochester during their lives.

See also

References

 

Bridges in Rochester, New York
Bridges completed in 2007
Road bridges in New York (state)
Monuments and memorials to women
Interstate 90
Bridges on the Interstate Highway System
Tied arch bridges in the United States
Steel bridges in the United States